InFiber AS is a Norwegian telecommunication company that specialize in provision of dark fiber.

The company owns a fiber optic network of more than 2000 route km in the Oslo region in Norway.

Until 2011, InFiber was called Hafslund Fibernett and was a part of the Hafslund Group. Hafslund sold the company to the private equity fund EQT V in December 2010 at an enterprise value of NOK 1477 million.

References

External links
InFiber home page

Telecommunications companies of Norway
Telecommunications companies established in 2009
Companies based in Oslo
Norwegian companies established in 2009